Austin is an immersive work of art and architecture designed by artist Ellsworth Kelly and built on the grounds of the Blanton Museum of Art in Austin, Texas, USA. The building is a permanent installation and part of the museum's permanent collection.

In January 2015, Kelly gifted to the Blanton Museum the design concept for a  stone building that he subsequently named Austin. This work of art relates to the tradition of modernist artist-commissioned buildings that includes the Rothko Chapel, the Thanks-Giving Square Chapel of Thanksgiving, and Henri Matisse's Matisse Chapel. Kelly said that the design of the building was inspired by Romanesque and Byzantine art he studied while in Paris on the G.I. Bill. Following Kelly's gift, the Blanton launched a $15 million campaign to realize the project.  The building was opened to the public February 18, 2018.

A companion exhibition of Kelly's prints, sketches, and sculptures was displayed February 18 - April 29, 2018 at the Blanton to trace the evolution of four core motifs throughout his career; spectrum, black and white, color grid, and totem.

Construction and design 
The design-build team that realized the project was Overland Partners and Linbeck Group. The structure is clad with 1,569 limestone panels from Alicante, Spain. The interior stone flooring and plaza flooring is granite from Georgia, United States. The entry door is made from a native Texas live oak tree from the site of the Dell Medical School. Austin has thirty-three mouth blown glass windows fabricated by Franz Mayer & Co. of Munich, Germany installed on three walls in "color grid", "starburst" and "tumbling squares" motifs.

There are fourteen black and white marble panels on the interior walls of Austin that each measure 40" x 40". The black marble is from Belgium, and the white marble is from Carrara, Italy. Kelly experimented with a variety of composition for these simple panels, inspired by the Stations of the Cross. There is also an 18 foot tall totem in Austin's interior, which is salvaged redwood.

References

External links

University and college chapels in the United States
University of Texas at Austin campus
University and college buildings completed in 2018